Zygmunt Andrychiewicz (27 May 1861, Justynów – 1943, Warta or Małków) was a Polish painter of portraits, landscapes, and genre scenes.

Biography 
He began his studies at the Warsaw School of Drawing while working as a decorative painter. From 1884 to 1886, thanks to a scholarship from the "" (Society for Encouragement of the Fine Arts), he was able to continue his studies at the Kraków Academy of Fine Arts with Władysław Łuszczkiewicz and Izydor Jabłoński. 

From 1887 to 1892, another scholarship enabled him to go to Paris, where he attended the Académie Colarossi and the Académie Julian, under the direction of William-Adolphe Bouguereau and Tony Robert-Fleury and shared a studio with Władysław Ślewiński. He had major showings at the Exposition Universelle (1889) and the Exposition Universelle (1900), as well as in Poland at the Zachęta National Gallery of Art in 1886.

From 1899 to 1918, he divided his time between Poland and France and made several visits to Italy. After 1918, he settled in Warsaw, where he became a drawing teacher at a girls' school and gave private lessons in his studio. 

After his retirement, he bought a house in the village of Małków, near his birthplace, and continued to paint landscapes. In 1929, he had a major showing at the "" in Poznań; celebrating ten years of Polish independence.

References

External links 

1861 births
1943 deaths
Jan Matejko Academy of Fine Arts alumni
Académie Julian alumni
Académie Colarossi alumni
19th-century Polish painters
19th-century Polish male artists
20th-century Polish painters
20th-century Polish male artists
People from Łódź East County
Polish landscape painters
Polish male painters